This is a geographical list of natural stone used for decorative purposes in construction and monumental sculpture produced in various countries.

The dimension-stone industry classifies stone based on appearance and hardness as either "granite", "marble" or "slate".

The granite of the dimension-stone industry along with truly granitic rock also includes gneiss, gabbro, anorthosite and even some sedimentary rocks.

Natural stone is used as architectural stone (construction, flooring, cladding, counter tops, curbing, etc.) and as raw block and monument stone for the funerary trade. Natural stone is also used in custom stone engraving. The engraved stone can be either decorative or functional. Natural memorial stones are used as natural burial markers.

Africa 

Marble

Asia

India 
See Stones of India

Pakistan 
Pakistan has more than 300 kinds of marble and natural stone.

Iran 
Iran has more than 250 kinds of marble, travertine, onyx, granite, and limestone.

Europe

Belgium 
 Limestone
 Petit Granit

France 
 Limestone
 Caen stone
 Pierre de Comblanchien, see also Côte d'Or (escarpment)
 Pierre d'Euville
 Pierre de Jaumont
 Tuffeau stone

Greece 
 Marble
 Verde Antico

Italy 
 Carrara marble
 Peperino
 Pietra serena
 Portoro Buono
 Travertine

Norway 
 Anorthosite

 Larvikite

 Marble

 Quartzite

Poland 
 Sandstone
 Radków
 Szczytna
 Czaple (Heron)
 Skała (Rock)
 Limestone
 Dębnik
 Kielce
 Granite
 Strzegom
 Strzelin
 Syenite, Granodiorite
 Kośmin
 Przedborowa
 Serpentinite
 Nasławice

United Kingdom 
 Chalk
 Clunch
 Flint
 Granite
 Aberdeen granite
 Limestone
 Ancaster stone
 Barnack rag
 Beer stone
 Clipsham stone
 Corallian limestone
 Cotswold stone (Oolitic limestone)
 Forest marble
 Frosterley Marble
 Ketton Stone
 Magnesian Limestone
 Portland stone
 Portland Admiralty Roach
 Portland Bowers Basebed
 Portland Bowers Lynham Whitbed
 Portland Bowers Saunders Whitbed
 Portland Grove Whitbed
 Portland Hard Blue
 Portland Independent Basebed
 Portland Independent Bottom Whitbed
 Portland Independent Top Whitbed
 Portland New Independent Whitbed
 Purbeck marble
 Sandstone
 Banktop
 Bearl
 Blaxter
 Catcastle
 Corsehill
 Corncockle
 Dunhouse Blue
 Dunhouse Buff
 Hall Dale
 Haslingden Flag
 Heavitree stone
 Locharbriggs
 Ravensworth
 Yorkstone
 Slate
 Welsh Slate
 Skiddaw Slate

Southeast Europe

Turkey 
 Elazig Cherry Marble
 Burdur Beige Marble
 Emprador
 Marmara marble
 Mugla White
 Noche Travertine

Middle East

Israel 
 Limestone/Dolomite
 Jerusalem stone

North America

Canada 
 Anorthosite

 Charnockite

 Diabase

 Diorite

 Granite

 Gabbro

 Gneiss

 Limestone

 Marble

 Monzonite

 Sandstone

 Slate

 Steatite (Soapstone)

 Stromatolites

 Syenite

Mesoamerica 
 Tezontle — a volcanic rock used in Pre-Columbian Mesoamerican architecture.
Archaeological sites with tezontle structures are located in present day México and northern Central America.

United States 
 Brownstone, a type of Triassic sandstone
 Granite, extensively quarried in Vermont, Georgia and New Hampshire
 Black granite – a common trade name for gabbro used as architectural material
 Austin limestone – a marble-like stone widely used as a building stone for interior and exterior wall cladding and interior and exterior paving

Oceania

New Zealand 
Oamaru stone — a creamy limestone mined in North Otago used for architecture and sculpture
Port Chalmers bluestone (also called Timaru bluestone) — a dark basalt mined in Otago and Canterbury used for architecture

South America

See also 
 Building stone
 List of types of limestone
 List of types of marble
 List of sandstones
 NIST Stone test wall — U.S. National Institute of Standards and Technology—NIST.
 List of rock types
 List of minerals
 Quarrying
 Rock (geology)
 Stonemasonry

References 

 Decorative stones
.Decorative stones
Decorative stones
Decorative stones
Decorative stones
Decorative stones
Decorative stones
Decorative stones
Decorative